Success Preparatory Academy is a charter school in New Orleans, Louisiana. It serves students from Kindergarten through the 8th grade. 

Success Prep was founded in 2009. It was co-founded by St. Claire Adriaan and Niloy Gangopadhyay. Adriaan left to join IDEA Public Schools in Texas in 2013.

Success Preparatory Academy previous home had building issues and the school used partitions to divide classrooms. As of 2018, the school has moved into a new home at the Thurgood Marshall building, approximately two miles from the previous site.

It has been rated a C school for 2017–2018.

References

External links
Success Preparatory Academy website

Charter schools in New Orleans
Elementary schools in New Orleans
Middle schools in New Orleans
Public elementary schools in Louisiana
Public middle schools in Louisiana